Poste Montagnais Airport, also known as Poste Montagnais (Mile 134) Airport , is located at Poste Montagnais, Quebec, Canada. The airport serves Hydro-Québec's Montagnais electrical substation in the Côte-Nord region near the Labrador border, along a series of 735kV transmission lines connecting to the Churchill Falls hydroelectric project.

References

Churchill Falls
Registered aerodromes in Côte-Nord
Hydro-Québec